The men's 75 kg muaythai event at the 2017 World Games was held from 28 to 30 July 2017 at the Orbita Hall. 8 Muay Thai practitioners from 8 nations are expected to compete.

Competition schedule
All times are in local time (UTC+2), according to the official schedule.

Results

Legend
 RSC-OC — Won by Referee Stopping Contest - Out Class in Round 3
 WO — Won by walkover

Gold medal match

Main bracket

Bronze medal match

Notes

References

External links
 Entry List by Event
 Brackets
 Medallists

Muaythai at the 2017 World Games